Franco Zaglio (born 2 March 1936) is a retired Italian footballer who played as a midfielder.

Honours
Internazionale
Serie A (1): 1962–63

External links

1936 births
Living people
Italian footballers
Italy international footballers
Serie A players
Serie B players
U.S. Cremonese players
S.P.A.L. players
A.S. Roma players
Mantova 1911 players
Inter Milan players
Genoa C.F.C. players

Association football midfielders